The 1986 NCAA Skiing Championships were contested at the Stowe Mountain Resort in Stowe, Vermont as part of the 33rd annual NCAA-sanctioned ski tournament to determine the individual and team national champions of men's and women's collegiate slalom skiing and cross-country skiing in the United States.

Utah, coached by Pat Miller, claimed their fourth team national championship, ten points ahead of Vermont in the cumulative team standings.

Venue

This year's NCAA skiing championships were hosted at the Stowe Mountain Resort in Stowe, Vermont

These were the fifth championships held in the state of Vermont (1955, 1961, 1973, 1980, and 1986).

Program

Men's events
 Slalom
 Giant slalom
 Cross country
 Cross country relay

Women's events
 Slalom
 Giant slalom
 Cross country
 Cross country relay

Team scoring

See also
List of NCAA skiing programs

References

NCAA Skiing Championships
NCAA Skiing Championships
NCAA Skiing Championships
NCAA Skiing Championships
NCAA Skiing Championships